Ronald L. Motley (October 21, 1944 – August 22, 2013) was an American trial attorney, and a principal of Motley Rice LLC–a law firm based in Mount Pleasant, South Carolina. He is best known for leading lawsuits against tobacco and asbestos companies.

Early life, education, and death
Ronald L. Motley grew up in North Charleston, South Carolina, where his father owned an Amoco gas station. He graduated from the University of South Carolina School of Law in 1971.

Motley died on August 22, 2013, after a prolonged illness. The cause of death was described by one colleague as "respiratory complications and by another as "complications from organ failure".

Late-career activities
Motley was lead counsel for more than 6,500 family members and survivors of the September 11, 2001 terrorist attacks seeking justice against al-Qaeda’s financiers.

Industry recognition
Motley has over his three-decade career won major judgments for his clients against the asbestos and tobacco industries. Ronald Motley was portrayed by Bruce McGill in the 1999 film The Insider, starring Russell Crowe.

External links
Law Firm of Motley Rice LLC
Ron Motley bio

References

 Bartleme, Tony. "Ron Motley, famed asbestos and tobacco lawyer, dead at 68." Post and Courier August 22, 2013
 Searcey, Dionne. "Hard-Charging Attorney Ronald Motley Dead at the Age of 68." Wall Street Journal blog.
 Senior, Jennifer. "A Nation Unto Himself", New York Times March 14, 2004

1944 births
2013 deaths
South Carolina lawyers
University of South Carolina alumni
People from North Charleston, South Carolina
20th-century American lawyers